Aman is the fifth Studio album by Lebanese singer Myriam Fares. It was released on January 5, 2015 by Myriam Music. The album combines elements of House and Techno with traditional and Oriental music, with the title track "Aman" remaking an old Andalusian song titled "Lamma Bada Yatathanna". 

The sixth single "Nifsi Aoulhalak" was largely successful, and has been played at global night clubs outside of the Middle East. The album garnered positive reviews from critics across the Middle East.

Background 
Myriam's fourth album Min Oyouni was released in 2011, and it was her first full-length Khaliji album. Aman featured several Khaljji tracks including the second single "Ana Gheir". In the album, Myriam performed in Lebanese, Egyptian and Khaliji accents.

Singles and music video 
The lead single, "Chou Bheb" a ballad song was released in February 2012 and was followed by "Ana Gheir" in December.

The third single "Halla Halla Ya Sabaya" was the opening theme for the TV show 'Sakan El Talebat' and was released in February 2013. The fourth single "Kifak Enta" was released in May 2013 alongside an official music video.

Track listing
 Nifsi Aoul'halak
 Deggou El Toboul
 Bizemmetak 
 Kifak Enta
 El Zeer
 Chou Bheb
 Gharrouk
 Halla Halla Ya Sabaya
 Sympatica 
 Ma Yani Noum
 Ghafi
 Ana Gheir (Teraggemni)
 Aman

Charts

References 

2005 albums
Myriam Fares albums
Arabic-language albums